Murtaza or Morteza or Mortaza, a Persianate form of the Arabic Murtada or Murtadha, is a common Muslim name. Pronunciation varies with accent, from native Arabic speakers to speakers of European and Asian languages.

The name is an epithet of Ali ibn Abi Talib, the cousin and son-in-law of the Islamic prophet Muhammad. Due to the rhyming nature, Murtaza is sometimes confused with Mustafa ('Chosen One'), an epithet of Muhammad.

Honorific/regnal name
 Ali ibn Abi Talib (601–661), son-in-law of Muhammad, fourth Rashidun Caliph, first Shi'a Imam
 Al-Husayn ibn Ali al-Abid, descendant of Ali, rose in revolt against the Abbasid Caliphate and assumed the name al-Murtadha as his regnal title.
 Al-Murtada Muhammad (died 922), second Zaydi Imam of Yemen
 Abu Hafs Umar al-Murtada (d. 1266), thirteenth Almohad caliph
 Sharif al-Murtaza (965–1044), Shi'a scholar
 Murtada al-Zabidi (1732–1790), Sufi scholar

Given name
Morteza Agha-Tehrani, hardline Iranian shia cleric and politician
Morteza Alviri (born 1948), Iranian politician, Mayor of Tehran 1999–2002
Morteza Ansari (1781–1864), Shia jurist
Morteza Asadi (born 1979), Iranian football defender
Morteza Avini (1947–1993), Iranian photographer of the Iran-Iraq war
Morteza Aziz-Mohammadi (born 1985), Iranian footballer
Morteza Bakhtiari (born 1952), Iranian politician
Morteza Barjesteh (born 1951), Iranian pop singer
Morteza Ebrahimi (born 1982), Iranian footballer
Morteza Gholi Khan Hedayat (1856–1911), Iranian politician and first chairman of the Iranian parliament
Morteza Hannaneh (1923–1989), Persian (Iranian) composer and horn player
Morteza Hosseini Fayaz (born 1928), Iraqi Twelver Shi'a Marja
Morteza Hosseini Shirazi, religious authority
Morteza Izadi Zardalou (born 1981), Iranian footballer
Morteza Kashi (born 1981), Iranian football footballer
Murtaza Ahmed Khan, Indian politician
Morteza Kermani-Moghaddam, former Iranian football player
Morteza Mahjoub (born 1980), Iranian chess grandmaster
Morteza Moghtadai (born 1936), Iranian Shia scholar
Morteza Mohammadkhan (born 1947), the Minister of Economic Affairs and Finance of Iran  1993–1997
Morteza Mohasses, prominent Iranian football coach and analyst
Morteza Momayez (1935–2005), Iranian graphic designer
Morteza Motahhari (1920–1979), Iranian scholar, cleric, University lecturer, and politician
Morteza Pouraliganji (born 1992), Iranian footballer
Morteza Poursamadi (born 1952), Iranian cinematographer
Murtaza Razvi, Pakistani journalist
Morteza Sadouqi Mazandarani (born 1946), Iranian Twelver Shi'a Marja
Morteza Sepahvand (born 1979), Iranian amateur boxer
Morteza Yazdanpanah (1888–1970), Iranian an army officer 
Morteza Zarringol, Iranian Kurdish politician
Morteza-Qoli Bayat (1890–1958), Prime Minister of Iran

Other similar names
Murtaza Bhutto (1954-1996), Pakistani Member of the Sindh Provincial Assembly and left-wing politician 
Murtala Muhammed (1938–1976) Nigerian Army general who was 4th Head of State of Nigeria.

Surname
Ali Murtaza, Indian cricketer
Mashrafe Mortaza, Bangladeshi Cricketer
Muzammil Murtaza, Pakistani Hazara Tennis Player

See also
 Al-Mujtaba

References

Arabic masculine given names
Iranian masculine given names